The 1962 New York Yankees season was the 60th season for the team. The team finished with a record of 96–66, winning their 27th pennant, finishing 5 games ahead of the Minnesota Twins. New York was managed by Ralph Houk. The Yankees played at Yankee Stadium. In the World Series, they defeated the San Francisco Giants in 7 games.  It was their 20th World Championship in franchise history, and their last until 1977.

Offseason
 December 14, 1961: Jesse Gonder was traded by the Yankees to the Cincinnati Reds for Marshall Bridges.

Regular season
 May 22, 1962: Roger Maris drew four intentional walks in a game.
 September 11, 1962: Former Ole Miss football quarterback Jake Gibbs made his Major League Baseball debut with the Yankees.

Game log

Season standings

Record vs. opponents

Notable transactions
 June 26, 1962: Bob Cerv was purchased from the Yankees by the Houston Colt .45s.

Roster

Player stats

Batting

Starters by position
Note: Pos = Position; G = Games played; AB = At bats; H = Hits; Avg. = Batting average; HR = Home runs; RBI = Runs batted in

Other batters
Note: G = Games played; AB = At bats; H = Hits; Avg. = Batting average; HR = Home runs; RBI = Runs batted in

Pitching

Starting pitchers
Note: G = Games pitched; IP = Innings pitched; W = Wins; L = Losses; ERA = Earned run average; SO = Strikeouts

Other pitchers
Note: G = Games pitched; IP = Innings pitched; W = Wins; L = Losses; ERA = Earned run average; SO = Strikeouts

Relief pitchers
Note: G = Games pitched; W = Wins; L = Losses; SV = Saves; ERA = Earned run average; SO = Strikeouts

1962 World Series 

AL New York Yankees (4) vs. NL San Francisco Giants (3)

Awards and honors
 Mickey Mantle, American League MVP
 Ralph Terry, Babe Ruth Award
All-Star Game (first game)
All-Star Game (second game)
 Elston Howard, All-Star Game

Farm system

LEAGUE CHAMPIONS: Fort Lauderdale

Harlan affiliation shared with Chicago White Sox

Notes

References
1962 New York Yankees at Baseball Reference
1962 World Series
1962 New York Yankees team page at www.baseball-almanac.com

New York Yankees seasons
New York Yankees
New York Yankees
1960s in the Bronx
American League champion seasons
World Series champion seasons